The Vortech G-1, also called the Compcop G-1, is an American helicopter that was designed in the 1970s. Plans for amateur construction were originally supplied by Compcop and today are provided by Vortech.

Design and development
It features a single main rotor and tail rotor, a single-seat open cockpit without a windshield, tricycle landing gear with main wheels and nose skid and a twin cylinder, air-cooled, two-stroke, single-ignition  Rotax 447 aircraft engine or Kawasaki 440 snowmobile engine. The  Rotax 503 can also be used.

The aircraft fuselage is made from bolted-together aluminum tubing.

The plans supplier notes this warning:

Specifications (G-1)

References

External links

1970s United States ultralight aircraft
1970s United States helicopters
Homebuilt aircraft
Single-engined piston helicopters
G-1